Augusts is a Latvian masculine given name, a cognate of the name August, and may refer to:
Augusts Annuss (1893–1984), Latvian painter 
Augusts Kepke (1886–19??), Latvian cyclist 
Augusts Kirhenšteins (1872–1963), Latvian microbiologist and educator
Augusts Malvess (1878–1951), Latvian architect
Augusts Strautmanis (1907–1990), Latvian chess master
Augusts Voss (1919–1994), Latvian-Soviet politician and party functionary

References

Latvian masculine given names